Patrick Baker (born 1939 – died October 4, 2022) was a retired Canadian professional and amateur box lacrosse goaltender.  Baker was an elite goaltender in his time, winning the Mann Cup Canadian Major Championship two times and being named the top goaltender in the Ontario Lacrosse Association eight times.  Baker is a member of the Canadian Lacrosse Hall of Fame.  He is considered a pioneer of the breakout pass.

Career
Pat first played lacrosse at the age of nine in Port Dalhousie, Ontario.  After three years of playing, he helped his team win the Ontario peewee championship.  The next day he and his family moved to Peterborough, Ontario.  At 17, he almost died of a childhood illness.

In 1958, Baker signed with the Brampton ABC's of the Ontario Junior A Lacrosse League and won the Minto Cup as Canadian Junior A Champions with them that season.  During his winters he played in the Ontario Hockey Association with the Hamilton Tiger Cubs (the Detroit Red Wings junior entry) for three seasons as a forward.

Baker started off his Major/Senior A career in 1959 with Peterborough Lakers.  The team went belly up after two seasons and he signed with the Brooklin Redmen instead.  After five seasons in Brooklin he returned to a newly formed Peterborough club in 1966 until 1973.

In 1968, he and his team joined the National Lacrosse Association and turned professional for two seasons.  In his second season in the league he won the NLA's professional championship.

Baker would win two Mann Cup Canadian Major Senior A championships: 1966 and 1973 with Peterborough.  He also won the 1969 NLA Championship with Peterborough at the professional level.  He was named 1973 Mann Cup most valuable player and won best goaltender in the Ontario Lacrosse Association ten times.  Baker was named Peterborough's sportsman of the year in 1969, to the Canadian Lacrosse Hall of Fame in 1980, the Ontario Lacrosse Hall of Fame in 1981, and the Peterborough and District's Sports Hall of Fame in 1983.  In 2008, Baker and his 1958 Minto Cup winning junior team were named to the Brampton Sports Hall of Fame.  In 2012, the 1956-59 Brampton Minto Cup dynasty was inducted into the Canadian Hall of Fame, Baker playing for the 1958 edition of the team.

Pat Baker died in Peterborough, Ontario, on October 4th, 2022, from complications related to COVID-19.

Stats
Source: Wamper's Bible of Lacrosse

References

External links
Peterborough Hall of Fame profile
Pat Baker's HockeyDB profile

1939 births
Living people
Canadian lacrosse players
Lacrosse people from Ontario
Sportspeople from St. Catharines
Lacrosse goaltenders